Chawne Monique Kimber (born 1971) is an African-American mathematician and quilter, known for expressing her political activism in her quilts. She was a professor at Lafayette College, where she headed the department of mathematics. Kimber is now the Dean of the College at Washington and Lee University.

Education and career
Kimber, a native of Frankfort, Kentucky, comes from a family of cotton farmers and quilters in Alabama. Although she writes that she "always loved math", she began her undergraduate studies at the University of Florida by studying engineering before switching to mathematics because she found it more fulfilling. She earned a master's degree at the University of North Carolina in 1995, as a student of Idris Assani. She returned to the University of Florida for doctoral studies, completing her Ph.D. in 1999. Her dissertation, Prime Ideals in Rings of Continuous Functions, connects abstract algebra with functional analysis and was supervised by Jorge Martinez.

After a term as Van Vleck Visiting Assistant Professor of Mathematics at Wesleyan College, she joined Lafayette College as an assistant professor.
In mathematics, she is known for incorporating concepts of social justice into her classroom teaching. She was a Professor and then head of the Math Department. In 2008, she along with Professor Sharon Jones began the Summer Program to Advance Leadership in STEM at Lafayette. This six-week program where incoming students take college level writing and calculus address along with modules in STEM. Students are those who are identified as leaders from groups typically underrepresented in STEM fields. In 2018, Kimber was one of six recipients of the prestigious Clare Booth Luce Scholarship to attend the HERS (Higher Education Resource Services) Institute. While head of the Math Department, the department "worked to promote an inclusive culture based on the understanding that math is a gateway to many other fields in the sciences, technology and engineering".

In May 2021, Washington and Lee University announced that Kimber would become the school's Dean of the College effective July 1, 2021. She is responsible "for 21 departments and 13 interdisciplinary programs. The dean serves as chair of the Committee on Courses and Degrees and belongs to the Faculty Executive Committee. The dean reports to the provost and serves on the Provost’s Academic Council as well as the President’s Council".

Quilting

Kimber began quilting in 2005, soon after completing her application for tenure at Lafayette, and her interest in quilting was renewed in 2007 by the death of her father. In 2008 she began creating highly politicized quilts and blogging about them, beginning with a series of quilts inspired by George Carlin's seven dirty words and by racist and sexist graffiti on her college campus. Her work has been associated with the "modern Quilting" movement, based on its geometric design and provocative content. Her work includes varied subject matter that raise social issues including the killing of African Americans and sexual assault.

Kimber's quilts are frequently included at quilting shows and museum exhibits of quilting. The Paul Mellon Arts Center put up a show of her works in 2018. One of her quilts inspired by the death of Eric Garner won first place at QuiltCon West in 2016,
and was included with other pieces by Kimber in a show on "Quilts and Human Rights" at the Pick Museum of Anthropology at Northern Illinois University. Her work, still not, was acquired by the Smithsonian American Art Museum as part of the Renwick Gallery's 50th Anniversary Campaign.
As well as quilting, Kimber has also exhibited quilting-inspired works of mathematical origami.

References

External links
completely cauchy, Kimber's blog
Quarantined Studio Visits: Chawne Kimber, an interview of Kimber (via Schweinfurth Art Center on YouTube)

1971 births
Living people
21st-century American mathematicians
American women mathematicians
Functional analysts
African-American mathematicians
American contemporary artists
African-American contemporary artists
African-American women artists
Quilters
University of Florida alumni
University of North Carolina alumni
Wesleyan University faculty
Lafayette College faculty
21st-century women mathematicians
21st-century American women artists
21st-century African-American women
21st-century African-American people
20th-century African-American people
20th-century African-American women
People from Frankfort, Kentucky
Artists from Kentucky